Volcano and Heart is the debut album of California-based band The Coral Sea. It was self-released May 14th 2005, and then later released on June 26, 2006 on Hidden Agenda Records. Two songs from the album, "Look at Her Face" and "Yesterday/Tomorrow" were featured on television in 2006, in Grey's Anatomy and Standoff (TV series) respectively.

Writing for AllMusic, James Christopher Monger states that "Villalobos' warbled but sweet tenor gives off notes of Television's Tom Verlaine and the arrangements and performances from both the band and string players are top-notch, especially on "In Between the Days" and "Ancient Modern People."

Track listing 
All songs composed by Rey Villalobos.
 Look at Her Face – 4:04
 Under the Westway – 3:55
 In Between the Days – 3:35
 In This Moment's Time – 4:52
 Yesterday/Tomorrow – 4:48
 Your Time Has Come – 5:36
 Lake and Ocean – 4:15
 Fell – 5:07
 Ancient Modern People – 3:46
 Descend – 4:49

Personnel 
Nate Birkey – Trumpet 
James Garza – Bass 
Matthew Talmage – Drums 
Rey Villalobos – Guitar, keyboard, vocals
Duncan Wright – Guitar

References
 

2006 albums